Andreas Nilsson is an artist and director based in Malmö, Sweden, best known for his contributions to the music videos of 2 Chainz, The Knife, Fever Ray, MGMT, Goldfrapp, José González, White Lies, Peter, Björn & John, Moby and Bright Eyes.

Videography

2013
 "Epic Split" for the Volvo Trucks Live Test 6", featuring Jean-Claude Van Damme
 "Play Hard" - David Guetta featuring Ne-Yo and Akon

2012
 "Birthday Song" - 2 Chainz
 "Paddling Out" - Miike Snow
 "The Wave" - Miike Snow

2010
 "Madder Red" - Yeasayer
 "Rabbit" - Miike Snow
 "Flash Delirium" - MGMT
 "Trigger Happy Hands" - Placebo

2009
 "This Must Be It" - Röyksopp
 "Stranger Than Kindness" - Fever Ray
 "It Don't Move Me" - Peter, Björn & John
 "Nothing to Worry About" - Peter, Björn & John
 "If I Had a Heart" - Fever Ray

2008
 "To Lose my life" - White Lies
 "I love the rain" - Yo Gabba Gabba
 "Death" - White Lies
 "Boo boo goo goo" - Caesars
 "Winner" - Swingfly & Ebbot
 "There is no light" - Wildbirds & Peacedrums
 "Look away Lucifer" - Madrugada
 "Alice" - Moby

2007
 "Oh My God" - Ida Maria
 "Step out of the shade" - Perishers
 "If I dont live today, then I might be here tomorrow" - Mando Diao
 "Teardrops" - José González
 "No Tomorrow" - Caesars
 "Killing for love" - José González
 "Down the line" - José González
 "The Cannibal Hiking Disaster" - Alterkicks
 "Saturday Waits" - Loney, Dear
 "Clairaudients" - Bright Eyes
 "Office Boy" - Bonde do Rolê
 "Malmö beach night" - Slagsmålsklubben
 "Tänk om himmlens alla stjärnor" - Hans Appelqvist
 "Im John" - Loney, Dear

2006
 "Ageing has never been his friend" - Love Is All
 "Martyr " - Depeche Mode
 "White on white crime" - Jai Alai Savant
 "Make out, fall out, make up" - Love Is All
 "Like a pen" - The Knife
 "Put your hands on your heart" - José González
 "Free" - OSI
 "We're from Barcelona" - I'm from Barcelona
 "Silent Shout" - The Knife

2005
 "Let my shoes lead me forward" - Jenny Wilson
 "Fly me away" - a short film, collaboration with Goldfrapp
 "Black Refugee" - Junip
 "Paper Tigers" - Caesars

2004
 "Heading for a breakdown" - The Soundtrack of Our Lives
 "Nurse Hands" - Isolation Years
 "Big Time" - The Soundtrack of Our Lives
 "Young&Armed" - The Plan
 "Benjamin" - Melpo Mene
 "Tuffa tider/På en sten, vid en sjö I en skog" - Gyllene Tider
 "the Wild" - Kristofer Åström
 "Gröna Linjen" - Alf
 "Mothers" - Melpo Mene
 "Twenty-two" - Bad Cash Quartet

2003
 "Heartbeats" - The Knife
 "Alla sagor har ett slut" - Sagor & Swing
 "Walk" - Erik DeVahl

2001
 "N.Y. Hotel" (with Andreas Korsár) - The Knife

External links

References

Living people
Swedish music video directors
Year of birth missing (living people)